Patriarch Nicholas I served as Greek Patriarch of Alexandria between 1210 and 1243.

Relations with the Church of Rome 
Like his predecessor, Nicholas I  maintained communion with the See of Rome.  He ordained a Latin rite priest and at the invitation of Innocent III of Rome, sent representatives to participate in the Fourth Lateran Council (1215).

In 1218–1219, Crusaders captured Damietta as a base to invade and ravage Egypt from the Ayyubid Muslims.  After a crushing defeat in 1221, Crusaders surrendered Damietta and signed an 8-year truce.  Native Egyptian Christians underwent renewed persecution by the Muslims in retaliation. Patriarch Nicholas died in deep poverty, 6 years before Crusaders returned to briefly capture Damietta before being liberated by the Muslims.

References

13th-century Patriarchs of Alexandria